The Small Demonstration Satellite (SDS) is a spacecraft or satellite which is built as part of a JAXA programme to develop and demonstrate technology for and through small satellites.  One of the mid-term goals is also to demonstrate formation flying.  SDS-1 launched aboard an H-IIA rocket on 23 January 2009, as a secondary payload to GOSAT.  The operation finished successfully on September 8, 2010.

The programme started in spring 2006, and continues on from the MicroLabSat spacecraft, which was launched on 14 December 2002, and ceased operations on 27 September 2006.

The following experiments were aboard:
MTP (Multi-mode integrated Transponder) 
SWIM (SpaceWire demonstration Module) 
AMI (Advanced Micro processing In-orbit experiment equipment) 
TFC (Thin Film Solar Cell) 
DOS (Small Dosimeter) 
Small satellite bus technology experiment. 
Total mass of the satellite is 100 kg.

References

External links 

eoPortal Directory - SDS-1

Satellites of Japan
Spacecraft launched in 2009
Spacecraft launched by H-II rockets
Derelict satellites orbiting Earth